The 1955 Tasmanian state election was held on 19 February 1955  in the Australian state of Tasmania to elect 30 members of the Tasmanian House of Assembly. The election used the Hare-Clark proportional representation system — six members were elected from each of five electorates.

The incumbent Labor government, led by Robert Cosgrove, had been in office continuously since 1934, although had not held a majority since 1946. It was looking to win another term in minority government against the opposition Liberal Party, on this occasion led by Rex Townley.

The election resulted in a parliamentary deadlock, with both the Labor and Liberal parties winning 15 seats in the 30 seat assembly.

The 1955 election also saw the first women elected to the House of Assembly: Mabel Miller for Franklin and Amelia Best for Wilmot, both members of the Liberal Party.

Results

|}

Distribution of votes

Primary vote by division

Distribution of seats

See also
 Members of the Tasmanian House of Assembly, 1955–1956
 Candidates of the 1955 Tasmanian state election

References

External links
Assembly Election Results, 1955, Parliament of Tasmania.
Report on Parliamentary Elections, 1955, Tasmanian Electoral Commission.

Elections in Tasmania
1955 elections in Australia
1950s in Tasmania
February 1955 events in Australia